Henry M. Peck House was a historic home located at West Haverstraw in Rockland County, New York.  It was built about 1865 and is a large two-story, wood-frame dwelling on a stone foundation.  It featured an S-curved mansard roof sheathed in slate in the Second Empire style.  It also had a central projecting entrance / tower bay and two-story gable-roofed kitchen / servant wing.

It was listed on the National Register of Historic Places in 2000.

It was destroyed by fire on July 3, 2002.

References

Houses on the National Register of Historic Places in New York (state)
Second Empire architecture in New York (state)
Houses completed in 1865
Houses in Rockland County, New York
National Register of Historic Places in Rockland County, New York